Writing FAST: How to Write Anything with Lightning Speed is a non-fiction book by Jeff Bollow, first published in Australia in 2004, which briefly became a best-seller on the Amazon.com charts in 2005.

The book targets new and intermediate writers, and distills the writing process into four parts - Focus, Apply, Strengthen, Tweak - which form the FAST acronym of the title.
 In the Focus phase, writers grasp and shape their concept.
 In the Apply phase, writers speed write to fill pages as quickly as possible.
 In the Strengthen phase, writers edit and shape the work.
 And in the Tweak phase, writers polish their prose to enhance the read.

The book's tone is conversational and motivational.

References

External links
 Writing FAST: How to Write Anything with Lightning Speed at Amazon.com
 Writing FAST official site

2004 books